The following is a timeline of the history of the city of Bourges, France.

Prior to 20th century

 ca.250 CE – Roman Catholic diocese of Bourges established.
 475 CE – Visigoths in power (until ca.507).
 762 – Siege and conquest by the Franks under King Pepin the Short.
 1195 – Bourges Cathedral construction begins (approximate date).
 1225 – Religious Council of Bourges held.
 1312 – Coutume de Berry (law) written (approximate date).
 1380 – Public clock installed (approximate date).
 1412 -  during the Armagnac–Burgundian Civil War.
 1424 - Bourges astronomical clock installed in the cathedral.
 1438 – Religious council held, resulting in the Pragmatic Sanction of Bourges issued by Charles VII of France.
 1453 - Palais Jacques Coeur completed.
 1463 – University of Bourges founded by Louis XI.
 1487 – .
 1492 –  (town hall) built.
 1510 –  built.
 1528 – Religious council held.
 1573 –  founded.
 1584 – Religious council held.
 1645 –  built.
 1790 – Bourges becomes part of the Cher souveraineté.
 1793 – Population: 15,964.
 1796 –  established.
 1831 – Canal de Berry constructed.
 1834 – Musée du Berry (museum) founded.
 1866 – Société des antiquaires du Centre founded.
 1875 – Société de géographie de Bourges formed.
 1886 – Population: 42,829.
 1893 – Dépêche du Berry newspaper begins publication.
 1898 –  begins operating.

20th century

 1911 – Population: 45,735.
 1927 –  opens.
 1928 – Bourges Airport opens.
 1944 – 36 Jews are taken from Bourges by the Milice in a rafle under the command of Joseph Lécussan and buried alive in the countryside.
 1961 –  (theatre group) formed.
 1963 –  opens.
 1964 – Société d'archéologie et d'histoire du Berry founded.
 1966 – Bourges 18 football club formed.
 1975 – Population: 77,300.
 1977 – Printemps de Bourges music festival begins.
 1985 –  (city hall) built.
 1986 – Conservatoire national du Pélargonium (garden) established.
 1989 –  (transit entity) established.
 1991 – Stade des Grosses Plantes (stadium) opens.
 1995 – Serge Lepeltier becomes mayor.

21st century

 2006 –  opens.
 2014 – Pascal Blanc becomes mayor.

See also
 Bourges history (fr)
 
 List of bishops of Bourges
 

Other cities in the Centre-Val de Loire region:
 Timeline of Orléans
 Timeline of Tours

References

This article incorporates information from the French Wikipedia and German Wikipedia.

Bibliography

 
 
 
 
 
 
  (+ Bourges)

External links

 Items related to Bourges, various dates (via Europeana)
 Items related to Bourges, various dates (via Digital Public Library of America)

Bourges
Bourges
bourges